Karly Robertson (born 14 November 1989) is a Scottish retired figure skater who represented Great Britain in competition. She is the 2018 Volvo Open Cup silver medalist, the 2019 Tayside Trophy silver medalist, the 2017 Skate Helena bronze medalist, the 2015 British national champion, and an 12-time British national silver medalist (2008-2014, 2017–2020, 2022).

On the junior level, she is the 2006 British junior national champion.

Robertson was coached by Simon and Debi Briggs in Dundee, Scotland.

She began skating after an ice rink opened in Dundee. Her sister is fellow figure skater Kristie Robertson.

Programs

Competitive highlights
CS: Challenger Series

References

External links 
 

British female single skaters
Sportspeople from Dundee
1989 births
Living people
Scottish female single skaters